Stem rot is a disease caused by a fungus infection in the stem. Fungus that causes stem rot are in the Rhizoctonia, Fusarium or Pythium genera. Stem rot can readily infect crops that are in their vegetative or flowering stages. The disease can survive up to five years in the soil. Symptoms of stem rot includes staining of infected area, reduced crop yield and crop failure. The disease can be spread through the use of unfiltered water as well as unsterilized tools. Also leaving previous dead roots in soil can increase the risk of stem rot. Spores can also enter the plant through injured stem tissue on the plant including from insect attacks. The fungus impedes stem functions like transporting nutrients. It can cause water to leak through the lesions of stem tissue. Common infected crop plants are soybeans and potatoes. An issue with maintaining this disease is the lack of management by crop producers. Producers of soybeans tend to not manage for the disease because it is not normally yield limiting in a large area. Fungicides can be used to manage the disease as well as burning the crop after harvest or letting it decompose.

Stalk rot
Species that cause stalk rot include:

Causative chemical agents produced by these fungal species may include mycotoxins:
Trichothecene.  Nematodes may cause symptoms similar to stem or stalk rots.

References

Fungal plant pathogens and diseases